William Henry Wilder (May 14, 1855 – September 11, 1913) was a lawyer and U.S. Representative from Massachusetts.

Biography
Wilder was born in Belfast, Maine. He moved to Gardner, Massachusetts, in 1866. He was president of Wilder Industries. He studied law, was admitted to the bar in 1900, and was admitted to practice before the United States Supreme Court in 1909. He studied the monetary systems of Europe in 1909 and wrote many articles and pamphlets on monetary questions.

Wilder was elected as a Republican to the Sixty-second and Sixty-third Congresses and served from March 4, 1911, until his death in Washington, D.C., on September 11, 1913. He is buried at Crystal Lake Cemetery in Gardner.

See also 
 List of United States Congress members who died in office (1900–49)

References

Bibliography
Who's who in State Politics, 1912 Practical Politics  (1912) p. 29.
 
 William H. Wilder, late a representative from Massachusetts, Memorial addresses delivered in the House of Representatives and Senate frontispiece 1915

People from Gardner, Massachusetts
1855 births
1913 deaths
People from Belfast, Maine
Republican Party members of the United States House of Representatives from Massachusetts
19th-century American politicians